Paul Nutarariaq is a Canadian Inuit actor, with Ojibwe-Cree background. He is most noted for his performance in the 2018 film The Grizzlies, for which he received a Canadian Screen Award nomination for Best Actor at the 7th Canadian Screen Awards in 2019.

He is originally from Igloolik, Nunavut but was primarily raised in Iqaluit.

He previously appeared in the films Throat Song and Iqaluit, and in the CBC comedy series Little Dog.

References

External links

Canadian male film actors
Male actors from Nunavut
Inuit male actors
Living people
Year of birth missing (living people)
People from Igloolik
People from Iqaluit